Introducing Pete Rugolo is an album by bandleader, composer, arranger and conductor Pete Rugolo featuring performances recorded in 1954 and released on the Columbia label, initially as a 10-inch LP, then with an additional four tracks as a 12-inch LP in 1955.

Reception

The AllMusic review by Scott Yanow commented: "This particular album finds him utilizing a big band filled with top studio and West Coast jazz players".

Track listing
All compositions by Pete Rugolo, except where indicated.
 "That Old Black Magic" (Harold Arlen, Johnny Mercer) - 2:53
 "Early Stan" - 2:44
 "Bazaar" (Aram Khachaturian) - 2:49
 "California Melodies" (David Rose) - 2:44
 "You Stepped Out of a Dream" (Nacio Herb Brown, Gus Kahn) - 2:16
 "360 Special" - 3:02
 "Laura" (David Raksin, Mercer) - 2:44
 "Come Back Little Rocket" - 2:30
 "In the Shade of the Old Apple Tree" (Egbert Van Alstyne, Harry Williams) - 2:24 Bonus track on 12 inch LP
 "Sidewalks of New York Mambo" (Charles B. Lawlor, James W. Blake) - 3:01 Bonus track on 12 inch LP
 "Theme from the Lombardo Ending" - 2:42 Bonus track on 12 inch LP
 "Mañana" (Dave Barbour, Peggy Lee) - 2:26 Bonus track on 12 inch LP
Recorded in Los Angeles, CA on February 8, 1954 (tracks 1, 2, 7 & 8), February 24, 1954 (tracks 3-6), April 28, 1954 (tracks 11 & 12), April 29, 1954 (track 9) and July 8, 1954 (track 10).

Personnel
Pete Rugolo - arranger, conductor
Pete Candoli, Buddy Childers (track 9), Maynard Ferguson, Conrad Gozzo (tracks 1-8, 11 & 12), Mickey Mangano (track 10), Shorty Rogers - trumpet 
Milt Bernhart, Harry Betts, Bob Fitzpatrick (tracks 11 & 12), John Haliburton (tracks 1-8), Herbie Harper - trombone
Vincent DeRosa (track 9), Joe Eager (tracks 3-6), Fred Fox (tracks 1-8, 11 & 12), John Graas (tracks 1, 2, 7, 8 & 10), Bill Hinshaw (track 11 & 12), Sinclair Lott (track 9 & 10) - French horn
Paul Sarmento - tuba
Harry Klee (tracks 1-8, 11 & 12), Ethmer Roten (tracks 9 & 10), Bud Shank - flute, alto saxophone
Bob Cooper - tenor saxophone, oboe  
Jimmy Giuffre - tenor saxophone, baritone saxophone
Bob Gordon - baritone saxophone
Claude Williamson - piano
Howard Roberts - guitar
Harry Babasin - bass
Shelly Manne - drums
Bernie Mattison - timpani, percussion (tracks 1-9, 11 & 12)

References

Pete Rugolo albums
1954 albums
Columbia Records albums
Albums arranged by Pete Rugolo
Albums conducted by Pete Rugolo